Benjamin Briand is an Australian film director.

Biography 

Ben is an Australian writer and director.

In 2007 he wrote and directed Hammer Bay. The TV film project featured two time Oscar nominated actress Jackie Weaver and was the result of winning the People's Choice Award at the first annual Optus ONE80PROJECT. The award was a joint venture with Sony Ericsson, Optus and MTV Australia.

With half a dozen short films to his name, Ben’s film ‘Apricot’ became an online cult sensation. The revered project was voted Best Narrative Film on Vimeo by a community of over 3 million users at the inaugural Vimeo Awards in New York City 2010. The film is regarded as one of the first breakthrough cinematic short form works on the internet. Jason Sondhi, the founder of Vimeo Staff Pick and Short of the Week wrote "No one has written a history of how we got to where we are with short film on the internet, but an anecdote : I remember Ben Briand's film 'Apricot' being important." In the same year he also wrote and directed two more short films, ‘Some Static Started’ and ‘Castor & Pollux’ which earned him a Best Director nomination from the Australian Directors Guild.

In 2014 he directed the coming of age noir short film ‘Blood Pulls A Gun’ which had its World Premiere at South by South West (SXSW) in competition for the Grand Jury Award with the Huffington Post calling it “seriously brilliant”. He was then awarded Best Emerging Filmmaker at the Melbourne International Film Festival. After the BFI London Film Festival screening it was listed by Raindance as one of the top ten coming of age films of the 21st century, noting Odessa Young’s breakout performance.

In 2016 Ben directed the award winning content short film ‘The Journey’, telling the extraordinary life story of Brazilian Ballet Dancer Ingrid Silva in first person POV. The film has been viewed online over 8 million times, won a Cannes Silver Lion and the Grand Prix at European Cristal Festival.

In November 2016 The Hollywood Reporter announced Ben would direct the feature film 'Fever Heart' starring Alexander Skarsgård and Cara Delevingne. The project was described as a 'gothic thriller'.

Ben was commissioned to write and direct ‘Armour’ starring Natasha Liu Bordizzo for Vogue China to launch their prestigious Vogue Film magazine in 2018. To date the publication has the largest readership reach of any magazine in the world. The project was created in conjunction with The Woolmark Company.

In 2019 he was invited to direct the first commercial for Apple to be made in Australia. The project titled 'First Dance' celebrates same sex marriage equality becoming law in Australia and featured real couples at their actual weddings. It was named Best TV Campaign of the year at the Australian B&T Awards and was nominated for the Film Lion in Cannes. The campaign drew criticism from conservative Hollywood actor James Woods and his social media followers.

His other commercials include Qantas, ASUS featuring Gal Gadot, Asahi Beer, Audi, Oroton with Rose Byrne,  Nespresso and Playboy Fragrances for Coty.

Filmography
 Armour (2019)
 Ingrid Silva The Journey (2016)
 Blood Pulls A Gun (2014)
 The Gentleman Shaver (2011)
 The Reformed Troglodyte (2011)
 Some Static Started (2010)
 Apricot (2009)
 Castor & Pollux (2009)
 Parting Moments: Following Minutes of a Separation (2008)

TV Series
 "Hammer Bay" (2007)

References

External links 

Ben Briand website
Apricot on Vimeo

Living people
Australian film directors
Australian male film actors
Australian film producers
Australian film editors
Australian cinematographers
Year of birth missing (living people)